Jamie Murray and Michael Venus defeated Nathaniel Lammons and Jackson Withrow in the final, 1–6, 7–6(7–4), [10–7] to win the doubles tennis title at the 2023 Dallas Open.

Marcelo Arévalo and Jean-Julien Rojer were the reigning champions, but chose not to compete this year.

Seeds

Draw

Draw

References

External links
 Main draw

Dallas Open - Doubles
Dallas Open (2022)